The National Videogame Museum is located in Sheffield, England and exhibits contemporary and historic video games.

History
In 2015, the National Videogame Arcade opened in Nottingham, as the world's first cultural centre dedicated entirely to videogames.

The NVA moved to Castle House in Sheffield in 2018, and was renamed the National Videogame Museum.

Collection
The museum features playable exhibits including the following hardware:
 BBC Micro
 Super Nintendo Entertainment System
 Sega Megadrive
 Game Boy Advance
 Nintendo Switch
 PlayStation
 Xbox
 PC

The exhibited games include:
Dancing Stage Fusion
Duck Hunt
Gunblade NY
QWOP
 Rock Band

References

Museums in Sheffield
Video game museums
Video gaming in the United Kingdom
Museums established in 2018
2018 establishments in England